, Hong Kong Airlines operates to the following destinations:

Destinations

References

Lists of airline destinations
Hong Kong transport-related lists